Attilla may refer to:

 alternate spelling for Atila (disambiguation)
 alternate spelling for Attila (disambiguation)
 alternate spelling for Atilla (disambiguation)
 alternate spelling for Attila the Hun (disambiguation)